The Passport is a novel by Nobel Prize-winning author Herta Müller, published in German in 1986. The German title (literally, "Man is a great pheasant in the world") refers to a saying in Romania. The novel, one of several for which the author was known when winning the Nobel in 2009, tells the story of a village miller in a German-speaking village in the Banat in Romania, who applies for permission to emigrate to West Germany. The novel was published in English by Serpent's Tail in 1989, the first of Müller's novels to be offered in direct translation.

Translations
Müller, Herta (1986) Der Mensch ist ein großer Fasan auf der Welt; Berlin: Carl Hanser Verlag 
(English) The Passport (September 1989); Translator: Martin Chalmers; London: Serpent's Tail; 96p. 
(French) L'homme est un grand faisan sur terre (1988); Translator: Nicole Bary; Paris: Maren Sell; 124p.  
(Serbian) Čovek je veliki fazan na ovom svetu (2011); Translator: Tijana Tropin; Belgrade: Zlatni Zmaj: Laguna; 150p. 
(Spanish) El hombre es un gran faisán en el mundo (1992);  Translator: Juan José del Solar; Madrid: Siruela; 128p. 
(Swedish) Människan är en stor fasan på jorden: en berättelse (1987); Translator: Karin Löfdahl; Stockholm: Alba 
(Czech) Cestovní pas (2010); Translator: Radka Denemarková; Prague: Mladá fronta; 112 p. 
(Malayalam) Passport (2010); Translator: Dr. S. Sreenivasan; India: DC Books; 120p. 
(Korean) 인간은 이 세상의 거대한 꿩이다 (2010); Translator: 김인순; Korea: Munhakdongne Publishing Corp.; 160p.

References

1986 novels
Transylvania in fiction
Works by Herta Müller
Novels set in Romania
Carl Hanser Verlag books
Serpent's Tail books